This is a list representing the Claudia Cardinale filmography. It also includes her television appearances.

Cinema 

 Goha (1958) as Amina
 Big Deal on Madonna Street (1958) as Carmelina
 Three Strangers in Rome (1958) as Marisaa
 Venetian Honeymoon (1959) as Angelica
 Anneaux d'or (1959, Short)
 Il magistrato (1959) as Maria
 Upstairs and Downstairs (1959) as Maria
 The Facts of Murder (1959) as Assuntina Jacovacci
 Audace colpo dei soliti ignoti (1959) as Carmela Nicosia
 Vento del sud (1959) as Grazia Macri
 Il bell'Antonio (1960) as Barbara Puglisi
 Austerlitz (1960) as Pauline Bonaparte
 Silver Spoon Set (1960) as Fedora
 Rocco and His Brothers (1960) as Ginetta
 Girl with a Suitcase (1961) as Aida Zepponi
 The Lovemakers (1961) as Bianca
 The Lions Are Loose (1961) as Albertine Ferran
 Auguste (1961) as cameo (uncredited)
 Senilità (1962) as Angiolina Zarri
 Cartouche (1962) as Vénus
 8½ (1963) as Claudia
 The Leopard (1963) as Angelica Sedara / Bertiana
 The Pink Panther (1963) as The Princess
 La ragazza di Bube (1964) as Mara
 Circus World (1964) as Toni Alfredo
 Time of Indifference (1964) as Carla
 The Magnificent Cuckold (1964) as Maria Grazia
 Sandra (Of a Thousand Delights) (1965) as Sandra Dawdson
 Blindfold (1966) as Vicky Vincenti
 Lost Command (1966) as Aicha
 The Professionals (1966) as Maria
 Sex Quartet (1966) as Armenia (segment "Fata Armenia")
 A Rose for Everyone (1967) as Rosa
 Don't Make Waves (1967) as Laura Califatti
 The Day of the Owl (1968) as Rosa Nicolosi
 The Hell with Heroes (1968) as Elena
 A Fine Pair (1968) as Esmeralda Marini
 Once Upon a Time in the West (1968) as Jill McBain
 La amante estelar (1968, Short)
 Nell'anno del Signore (1969) as Giuditta Di Castro
 Diary of a Telephone Operator (1969) as Marta Chiaretti
 The Red Tent (1969) as Valeria
 The Adventures of Gerard (1970) as Teresa, Countess of Morales
 The Butterfly Affair (1971) as Popsy Pop
 The Legend of Frenchie King (1971) as Marie Sarrazin
 A Girl in Australia (1971) as Carmela
 L'udienza (1972) as Aiche
 La Scoumoune (1972) as Georgia Saratov
 One Russian Summer (1973) as Anya
 I guappi (1974) as Lucia Esposito
 Conversation Piece (1974) as Moglie del professore (uncredited)
 The Immortal Bachelor (1975) as Gabriella Sansoni
 Libera, My Love (1975) as Libera Valente
 Qui comincia l'avventura (1975) as Claudia
 Il comune senso del pudore (1976) as Armida Ballarin
 Il prefetto di ferro (1977) as Anna Torrisi
 Fire's Share (1978) as Catherine Hansen
 Goodbye & Amen - L'uomo della CIA (1978) as Aliki
 Little Girl in Blue Velvet (1978) as Francesca Modigliani
 L'arma (1978) as Marta Compagna
 Corleone (1978) as Rosa Accordino
 Escape to Athena (1979) as Eleana
 Si salvi chi vuole (1980)
 The Skin (1981) as Principessa Consuelo Caracciolo
 The Salamander (1981) as Elena Leporello
 Fitzcarraldo (1982) as Molly
 Le Cadeau (1982) as Antonella Dufour
 The Ruffian (1983) as La 'baronne'
 Henry IV (1984) as Matilda
 Claretta (1984) as Claretta Petacci
 Next Summer (1985) as Jeanne
 La donna delle meraviglie (1985) as Maura
 A Man in Love (1987, Un homme amoureux) as Julia Steiner
 La Révolution française (1989) as Yolande-Gabrielle de Polastron, duchesse de Polignac (segment "Années Lumière, Les")
 Hiver 54, l'abbé Pierre (1989) as Hélène
 Atto di dolore (1990) as Elena
 The Battle of the Three Kings (1990) as Roxelane
 Mayrig (1991) as Araxi (Mayrig)
 588, rue Paradis (1992) as Araxi (Mayrig)
 Son of the Pink Panther (1993) as Maria Gambrelli
 Elles ne pensent qu'à ça... (1994) as Margaux
 A Summer in La Goulette (1996) as Herself
 Sous les pieds des femmes (1997) as Aya, in 1996
 Stupor mundi (1997) as Constance of Aragon
 Riches, belles, etc. (1998) as La baronne Mitsy
 Li chiamarono... briganti! (1999) as Donna Assunta
 Un café... l'addition (1999, Short) as Mme Gigi
 And Now... Ladies and Gentlemen (2002) as Madame Falconetti
 The Demon Stirs (2005) as Herself
 Cherche fiancé tous frais payés (2007) as Elisabeth
 Le Fil (2009) as Sara
 Signora Enrica (2010) as Signora Enrica
 A View of Love (2010) as La mère de Marc
 Father (2011) as Elvira
 Gebo and the Shadow (2012) as Doroteia
 The Artist and the Model (2012) as Léa
 Deauville (2012)
 Piccolina bella (2012)
 Joy de V. (2013) as Signora Morosini
 The Silent Mountain (2014) as Nuria Calzolari
 Ultima fermata (2014) as Rosa
 Les Francis (2014) as Mina
 Effie Gray (2014) as Viscountess
 All Roads Lead to Rome (2015) as Carmen
 Twice Upon a Time in the West (2015) as Claudia
 Nobili bugie (2017) as Duchessa
 Una gita a Roma (2017) as Marguerite
 Rudy Valentino (2017) as zia Rosa
 Niente di serio (2017) as Angela
 The Island of Forgiveness (2020) as Agostina

Television 
 Jesus of Nazareth (1977) as The Adultress / The Adulteress
 Princess Daisy (1983, TV Movie) as Anabelle de Fourdemont Valenski
 La Storia (1986, TV Movie) as Ida Ramundo
 Naso di cane (1986, TV Mini-Series) as Laura
 Blu elettrico (1989, TV Movie) as Tata
 Mayrig (1993, TV Mini-Series) as Araxi (Mayrig)
 Flash - Der Fotoreporter (1993, TV Series) as Gilda Ricci / Monica Ricci
 10-07: L'affaire Zeus (1995, TV Series) as Agent
 Nostromo (1996, TV Mini-Series) as Teresa Viola
 Deserto di fuoco (1997, TV Mini-Series) as Leila
 Mia per sempre (1998, TV Mini-Series) as Mary O'Sullivan
 Élisabeth - Ils sont tous nos enfants (2000, TV Movie) as Claude Barde
 Hold-up à l'italienne (2008, TV Movie) as Cécile
 Il giorno della Shoah (2010, TV movie) as Ester
 Bulle (2020, TV Series) as Marthe
 Rogue City (Bronx) (2020) as Catarina Bastiani

Italian filmographies
Actress filmographies